Rotaliana is a subclass of benthic Foraminifera with multichambered tests of perforate hyaline calcite. Tests may be planospiral, low or high trochospiral, or serial. Interiors may be complex with secondary chambers and interconnecting canal systems. Rotaliana are separate from the planktonic Globigerinana although both have tests of similar composition.  The Textulariana, which contains forms that are rather similar, differs in be agglutinated.

Sixteen orders are included (Mikhalevich, 1980) among which are the Asterigerinida, Bolivinitida, Discorbida, and Rotaliida. Loeblich and Tappan (1988), with Foraminifera an order, lists 24 superfamilies within the suborder Rotaliina, which are equivalent to or contained within the orders of the Rotaliina Mikhalevich.

References

Subclass: Rotaliana Mikhalevich,1980
Alfred R Loeblich Jr and Helen Tappan, 1988 
Forminiferal Genera and Their Classification

SAR supergroup subclasses
Rotaliata